Yanjmaagiin Dorj (born 17 June 1954) is a Mongolian judoka. He competed in the men's extra-lightweight event at the 1980 Summer Olympics.

References

1954 births
Living people
Mongolian male judoka
Olympic judoka of Mongolia
Judoka at the 1980 Summer Olympics
Place of birth missing (living people)